Qahej-e Pain (also Romanized as Qahej-e Pā’īn) is a village in Kharqan Rural District, Bastam District, Shahrud County, Semnan Province, Iran. At the 2006 census, its population was 488, in 123 families.

References 

www.ovaltineusa.com

Populated places in Shahrud County